Castra Nova may refer to the following (Roman) entities :

 Castra Nova equitum singularium, an ancient Roman fort in Rome which came to house part of the mounted imperial bodyguard equites singulares

 Places and jurisdictions 
 Castra Nova (Mauretania), also a former bishopric, presently Mohammadia in Algeria and a Latin Catholic titular see
 Castra Nova, Dacia